Where Myth Becomes Memory is the sixth studio album by English experimental rock band Rolo Tomassi, released on 4 February 2022 by MNRK Heavy.

Background and recording 

The album has been described by the band as the final part in an 'unintended trilogy', following on from Grievances and Time Will Die and Love Will Bury It.

Lead vocalist Eva Korman moved to New Jersey two years before the album's recording - due to the COVID-19 pandemic, this meant that she was unable to travel to the UK to record. Instead, her vocals were recorded remotely at a studio in Waldwick, with the rest of the band recording their tracks at The Ranch in Southampton.

Reception 

At Metacritic, which assigns a rating out of 100 to reviews from mainstream critics, Where Myth Becomes Memory received an average score of 84, based on 4 reviews, indicating "universal acclaim".

DIY gave the album 4.5 stars out of 5, calling it "another truly original triumph".

Kerrang! gave the album a score of 4/5, saying that "it is a record that mesmerises without compromise, and which could not have come from anyone else".

Track listing

Personnel
Credits adapted from the liner notes of Where Myth Becomes Memory.

Rolo Tomassi
 Eva Korman – lead vocals
 James Spence – electronic keyboards, piano and co-lead vocals
 Chris Cayford – electric guitar
 Nathan Fairweather – electric bass guitar
 Al Pott – drum kit

Additional personnel
 Lewis Johns – production, mixing, horn arrangement on 'Prescience'
 Mikhail Marinas - additional engineering
 Grant Berry – mastering
 Simon Moody – art, design

References 
Citations

Rolo Tomassi albums
2022 albums
Alternative metal albums by English artists
Post-rock albums by English artists
Experimental rock albums by English artists